Julia Pimsleur is an author, scaling coach and entrepreneur. She is the author of the best-selling book Million Dollar Women: The Essential Guide for Female Entrepreneurs Who Want to Go Big, Go Big Now, and the founder of Million Dollar Women Network. She is also the founder and CEO of the Little Pim language education system, as well as a former documentary filmmaker. She is the daughter of Paul Pimsleur, who was a scholar of applied linguistics.

Biography
Pimsleur is the daughter of Paul Pimsleur, the creator of the Pimsleur Language Aptitude Battery and the Pimsleur Method. She is also the author of Million Dollar Women: The Essential Guide for Female Entrepreneurs Who Want to Go Big (Simon & Schuster) and the founder of the Million Dollar Women social venture to help more women entrepreneurs get to $1M in revenues. She earned her Bachelor of Arts degree from Yale University, Master of Fine Arts degree from the French National Film School in Paris, and attended Harvard Business School’s Executive Education Program. Prior to founding Little Pim, Pimsleur was the co-founder and CEO of a film production company which produced independent documentaries sold to HBO, Cinemax Reellife and PBS. She produced several films in association with the Arts Engine film organization and was featured on This American Life. Her films Nuyorican Dream and Innocent Until Proven Guilty were shown on Cinemax Reellife and HBO and at festivals around the world including the Sundance Film Festival. Pimsleur's film Boola Boola... Yale Goes Coed was awarded the Sudler Award for the Arts at Yale University.

Before starting her own company, Pimsleur was a fundraiser for human rights organizations, including Echoing Green, CPJ and Witness. She served on several nonprofit boards, including the Advisory Board of Global Language Project, a nonprofit organization which brings free foreign language instruction to children in disadvantaged public schools, and as Accelerator Chair of the Entrepreneurs’ Organization.

She is the host of the Million Dollar Mind podcast and CEO Check-In on IG TV.

Pimsleur speaks French, Italian, some Spanish and lives in New York City with her two sons.

Career
Pimsleur is the Founder of Little Pim, a system for introducing young children to a second language using a proprietary method called the "Entertainment Immersion Method."

Pimsleur coaches women business owners on entrepreneurship and sales through her online programs, Million Dollar Women Masterclass, and Sales CURE (www.scale-cure.com). Pimsleur has written over 100 blogs on scaling up, available on her site at www.juliapimsleur.com and on Forbes.com.

References

External links
 Little Pim
 Million Dollar Women Masterclass
 Julia Pimsleur's Web site

Year of birth missing (living people)
Living people
American women chief executives
American women writers
Businesspeople from New York City
Yale University alumni
21st-century American women